Nobel/Sawdust Bay Water Aerodrome  is located  southwest of Nobel, Ontario, Canada.

See also
Nobel/Lumsden Air Park

References

Registered aerodromes in Parry Sound District
Seaplane bases in Ontario